Dr. Turki Faisal Al-Rasheed (born 5 August 1954) is a Saudi businessman. He is the chair and the Founder of Golden Grass Incorporated in Riyadh.

He leads the Saudi Voter Center, an internet-based website which encourages Saudi nationals to become involved in Saudi Arabia's non-democratic elections. He is adjunct professor at the Department of Biosystems Engineering, College of Agriculture and Life Sciences at the University of Arizona, Tucson.

Early life and education
Turki Faisal Al-Rasheed is a descendant of Ibn Rashid family, the ruler of Hail, a clan of the Shammar Tribe. His father was one of the handful of the Ibn Rashid family who walk out the last out of the Barzan Palace on 2 November 1921.

He earned his degree in Doctor of Business Administration (DBA) at Liverpool Business School (LJMU), U.K. His Executive Master in Business Administration (EMBA) at college of Industrial Management at King Fahd University for Petroleum and Minerals (KFUPM), Saudi Arabia and Bachelor of Science in Agriculture Engineering at the University of Arizona, Tucson.

Career
He is a board member of the National Agriculture Development Company (NADEC), an Agriculture Committee of the Riyadh Chamber of Commerce, and the President and Chairman of Turki Faisal International Corporation (TFIC), from 1981 to present

See also
House of Saud
Rashidi dynasty

References

External links
 
  
 Blogspot

Turki
Turki
Turki
Turki
1954 births
Living people
Alumni of Liverpool John Moores University
King Fahd University of Petroleum and Minerals alumni
Saudi Arabian Muslims
University of Arizona alumni